Monstera oreophila is a flowering plant in the genus Monstera and family Araceae.

Distribution 
Monstera Oreophila is native to Costa Rica and Panamá.

References 

oreophila